The following is a list of unions, guilds, or professional associations for film directors.

Active

Disestablished

References

Film directing
Film directing
Film-related lists